The 2017 United Women's Soccer season was the 23nd season of pro-am women's soccer in the United States, and the 2nd season of the UWS league.

Changes from 2016 
 Detroit Sun FC, FC Indiana, Fort Wayne United Soccer Club, Grand Rapids FC, Indy Premier SC, Michigan Legends FC, and Toledo Villa FC joined the league and were placed in the newly formed Midwest Conference.
 Syracuse Developmental Academy, Western New York Flash, and Rochester Lady Lancers joined the league and were placed in the East Conference.
 Calgary Foothills WFC and So Cal Crush FC joined the league and were placed in the West Conference.
 The league championship moved to a four-team format, with one representative from each conference (the West conference champions, the winner of the four-team Midwest playoffs, and the winner of a two-team East playoff) and a fourth wild-card team to be determined by record, strength of schedule, travel concerns, and other factors. These four teams are then seeded and play two semifinal matches, with the winners playing in the finals for the league title.

Standings

East Conference

Midwest Conference

West Conference

Playoffs

East Conference Playoffs 

Bold = winner* = after extra time, = penalty shootout score

Midwest Conference Playoffs 
Hosted by Grandville High School in Grandville, Michigan

Bold = winner* = after extra time, = penalty shootout score

National Playoffs 
Hosted by Grandville High School in Grandville, Michigan. Classified to the semifinals are Grand Rapids FC (Midwest Conference champion), Santa Clarita (West Conference champion), Long Island Rough Riders (East Conference champion) and Detroit Sun FC invited by United Women's Soccer as a wildcard.

Bold = winner* = after extra time, = penalty shootout score

Semifinals

UWS Championship

Championship MVP: Michaela Kovacs (Grand Rapids FC)

Statistical leaders

Top scorers 

Source:

Top assists 

Source:

League awards

Individual Awards
Player of the Year: Deyna Castellanos (SAC)
Defensive Player of the Year: Caitlyn Clem (DET)
Coach of the Year: Lewis Robinson (GRA)

All-League First Team
F: Bethany Balcer (GRA), Carissima Cutrona (WNY)
M: Jackie Bruno (NJC), Deyna Castellanos (SAC), Kimberly Marra (LIR), Annie Steinlage (GRA)
D: Michaela Kovacs (GRA), Natalia Kuikka (SAC),  Rebecca Raber (NJC), Lauren Sesselmann (SAC)
G: Caitlyn Clem (DET)

All-League Second Team
F: Haley Crawford (LAN), Joelle Gosselin (CAL), Madison Schupbach (DET)
M: Brenna Brown (NEM), Chloe Castaneda (SAC), Dani Evans (DET)
D: Jennifer Cafferky (NEM), Taylor Groth (LIR), Natalie Norris (RSL),  Brooke Salmon (NYS)
G: Emily Burns (CAL)

References

External links 

 
2017
1